Peng Xiuwen (7 February 1931 – 28 December 1996) was a noted Chinese conductor and composer. He was a native of Wuhan, Hubei province, in central China.

Peng learned to play the erhu beginning at age seven.  In 1956, he became the conductor and director of China Broadcasting Chinese Orchestra, an orchestra of Chinese traditional (and modernized traditional) instruments, based in Beijing. 

Peng Xiuwen arranged numerous traditional music pieces for the Chinese orchestra. Among these is a piece of orchestral music inspired by Tang dynasty poet Zhang Ruoxu's famous poem "Spring River in the Flower Moon Night" (Chun Jiang Hua Yue Ye, 春江花月夜) first written by Liu Raozhang (柳堯章) in 1925 based on an older tune for pipa. It has since entered the classical repertoire for the traditional Chinese instrument guzheng. He also adapted music pieces originally written for a Western orchestra to be played in a Chinese orchestra, such as Dance of the Yao People, as well as Bizet's Carmen suite.

References

External links
Peng Xiuwen interview (in Chinese)

1931 births
1996 deaths
Chinese male composers
Chinese conductors (music)
People's Republic of China musicians
Musicians from Wuhan
20th-century composers
Chinese composers
20th-century Chinese musicians
20th-century conductors (music)
20th-century male musicians